Real Bedford Football Club is a football club based in Bedford, England. They are affiliated to the Bedfordshire County Football Association.

History

Bedford United
Bedford United were established in 1957, the works team of the printing firm Diemer & Reynolds. In 1971 the club joined Division Three of the United Counties League, which was renamed Division Two the following season. They remained in Division Two until leaving the league in 1979, dropping into the Bedfordshire County League, going on to win Division One in 1979–80. In 1989 they joined Division One of the South Midlands League, becoming a member of the Senior Division following league reorganisation in 1993. In 1995–96 they finished third in the division, earning promotion to the Premier Division.

In 1997 the South Midlands League merged with the Spartan League to form the Spartan South Midlands League, with Bedford United placed in the Premier Division North. After finishing fourteenth in the division in the league's first season, they were placed in the Senior Division the following season. A third-place finish in 1999–2000 saw them promoted to the Premier Division.

US Valerio
Unione Sportiva Valerio was formed as a Sunday league club in 1985 and was named after its founder Nicola Valerio.

Merged club
The two clubs merged in 2002 to form Bedford United & Valerio, taking Bedford United's place in the Premier Division of the Spartan South Midlands League. They finished second-from-bottom of the Premier Division in 2004–05 and were relegated to Division One. In 2006 they were renamed Bedford Valerio United, before being renamed simply Bedford in 2007.

In 2014–15 they finished third in Division One, earning promotion to the Premier Division. However, they finished bottom of the Premier Division the following season and were relegated back to Division One.

In April 2022 the club was taken over by bitcoin podcaster Peter McCormack, who became chairman, having previously stated that he intended for the club to reach the Premier League. The club's name was changed to Real Bedford prior to the 2022–23 season.

Ground
Bedford United initially played on a pitch at the printers' firm, before moving to the nearby village of Cople and then returning to Bedford to play at Allen Park. They subsequently played at Fairhill on Clapham Road, where the club's record attendance of 1,500 was set for a South Midlands League match against Bedford Town.

The land was later bought by Sainsbury's and Bedford United temporarily groundshared with Kempston Rovers at Hillgrounds, before moving to McMullen Park in 1996. The ground was named for Jim McMullen, one of the club's founders. When the merged club was formed, they continued to play at McMullen Park.

Honours
Bedfordshire Senior Trophy
Winners 2012–13

Records
Best FA Cup performance: Preliminary round, 2003–04, 2004–05, 2007–08
Best FA Vase performance: Second round, 2006–07, 2009–10

See also
Real Bedford F.C. players

References

External links

Association football clubs established in 2002
2002 establishments in England
Football clubs in Bedfordshire
Football clubs in England
Sport in Bedford
Spartan South Midlands Football League
Works association football teams in England